Daisy of Love is an American reality television dating show which stars Daisy de la Hoya, the runner-up of the VH1 reality dating show Rock of Love 2. The show premiered on April 26, 2009, at 9:00 pm ET on VH1.

Contestants

In Episode 7, "12 Pack" asked to be called by his real name, Dave.
In Episode 4, London withdrew from the competition, but in Episode 9, he was brought back into the competition.

Elimination order

 Contestants in bold indicates that they received V.I.P. Access/Passes.
 The contestant won the competition.
 The contestant went on a solo date with Daisy.
 The contestant went on a group date with Daisy.
 The contestant was eliminated.
 The contestant went on a date with Daisy, but was eliminated.
 The contestant went on a date with Daisy, but voluntarily withdrew from the competition. 
 The contestant was going to receive a chain, but was eliminated.
 The contestant voluntarily withdrew from the competition.
 The contestant was eliminated outside the house.
 The contestant did not receive a chain, but was allowed to stay due to another contestant quitting the competition.
 The contestant was supposed to be eliminated, but Daisy decided to keep the contestant.
 The contestant was brought back into the competition.

 In episode four, Daisy left the elimination ceremony before distributing all of the chains. 6 Gauge, Fox, and Sinister each did not receive a chain, but was allowed to stay due to London quitting the competition.
 In episode five, there was no elimination. Names are listed in alphabetical order since Daisy informed the guys that Cage has left the competition.
 In episode seven, Daisy eliminated Fox at the beginning of the elimination ceremony and no chains were given out. The remaining contestants are listed in alphabetical order.
 In episode nine, London was brought back into the competition while the rest of the guys went on dates with Daisy.
 Episode 11 was a recap episode.

Episodes

Don't Be Stupid
First aired April 26, 2009 (2M viewers)

After leaving Mexico with a broken heart, Daisy returns to find a man that is compatible with her. This time she brings Riki Rachtman to help her pluck out the fakes from the real. Although there are 20 men in the show, one of them is very familiar; 12 Pack, who has appeared on I Love New York and I Love Money. The men meet Daisy after she performs a song on stage for them. She says she is building a career for herself as a "singer, model, and all around bad ass". After the show, the men become situated and later, Daisy gives them nicknames to show off their personalities. The men are then led to the "mixer". As all the guys vie for her attention during the mixer, Flipper, who wants to grab the attention of Daisy, decides to jump off the stage bars and into the pool. Daisy confronts Tool Box for saying "Where the bitches at?" and warns him that she will not tolerate that kind of behavior. Weasel, London, and Torch become too intoxicated to form a connection with Daisy. Dropout fails to impress Daisy and she thinks that he is trying too hard to act cool. '84, '85, and '86 tell Daisy that they are only interested in having a good time and dating her together. After the party, Daisy gathers the men together, telling them that she knows who is there for her. She sends the triplets ('84, '85, and '86) packing before the elimination ceremony saying that she thought they were awesome, but that she is serious about finding love and will not share men or be shared by men. Riki invites them to take home with them all the food they can carry. Although the rest of the men think they are safe, Daisy tells them that two more people still have to go. After London and Weasel fall asleep, the guys decide to sabotage Weasel by drawing on his face. They are then gathered in the elimination room as Daisy gives chains one by one to the guys and asks them if they "will stay and be her rockstar". After many chains are passed out, it is soon down to Dropout, London, Torch, and Weasel. She decides to give Weasel and London another chance, and eliminates Torch and Dropout.
 Bottom 4: Dropout, London, Torch, Weasel
 Eliminated: '84, '85, '86, Dropout, Torch
 Elimination Notes:
 The triplets of the band Snake of Eden ('84, '85, and '86) were eliminated before the elimination ceremony after they revealed that they were basically there just for the free food and liquor, and that they were only interested in dating Daisy together as a set.
 Dropout was eliminated for being a "Goofball" and seeming too much like a cartoon character.
 Torch was eliminated because Daisy did not feel a connection, and she could not understand him, especially because "he clicked like a dolphin".

True Bromance
First aired May 10, 2009

The guys wake up the next morning and as they ready themselves, 12 Pack reads them a letter from "Daisy's Diary" which tells them about their next challenge. The guys are upset about the events concerning Brooklyn and are all very angry that he received a chain. Brooklyn is aware of this and states he will "keep his distance from the other guys". When the guys reach the area of their next challenge, they are surprised to find it takes place in a desert. Ricki tells the guys that today's challenge is all about protecting Daisy. They learn that they must protect a symbolic Daisy mannequin from several sharp-shooting paintballers as they take it from the limo, to the "red carpet", and then to the "stage door". The men are divided into three teams of four and the teams must run their Daisy mannequin from location to location and the team with the least damaged Daisy mannequin will win the challenge and a date with Daisy. The Beige Team goes first with Cage as the first runner. Cage tries to protect the mannequin, but after getting hit so many times with paintballs, he says he begins to black out and the mannequin splits in half. Cage hands it to Brooklyn, who screams and soon hands it off to 6 Gauge. 6 Gauge hands it off to Cable Guy and Cable Guy actually falls on top of the mannequin, crushing many of its parts. The Orange Team goes and Big Rig, Flex, Fox, and Tool Box do a decent job of defending the mannequin. The Black Team defends the mannequin the best so, Sinister, London, Chi Chi and 12 Pack all win a date with Daisy and grants Sinister a VIP date for his good performance. After the challenge, Brooklyn thanks Daisy for his second chance, but says he lied to Daisy because he was drunk and says he is still in love with his ex-girlfriend. He says he is "throwing in the towel". Riki becomes infuriated and accuses Brooklyn of lying and criticizes him for hurting Daisy. Daisy says he was just wasting her time and that she does not need him. Daisy decides to bring all the guys to a club where they can all "let loose". While most of the guys battle for her attention and spend time with her, she forgets Sinister's VIP date, but he says he will let it go because it was the "rockstar thing to do". She also gets angry with Fox because she says that everyone was trying to spend time with her except for him. When confronted about it, Fox told her he does not want to compete with twelve other guys. The next day, Daisy has a romantic art date with 12 Pack, Sinister, Chi Chi, and London, where she paints on their bodies and they paint on her. 12 Pack opens up a lot and talks about his past love life. Sinister connects with Daisy and kisses her, which makes Chi Chi jealous. Chi Chi then kisses Daisy all over her body, which she found creepy. London connects very well with Daisy and she says he could be the one she is looking for. After the date, Cable Guy connects with Daisy and she likes his honesty, but says that he is not aggressive enough for this competition. Flex and Daisy share one-on-one time, and he makes her laugh a lot and Daisy forms a strong connection with him. Toolbox gets drunk and tells the other contestants that he is not "feeling Daisy for shit" and does not have a connection with her, which angers Flex. At elimination, she gives the first chain to Flex, followed by Sinister, London, 6 Gauge, 12 Pack, Big Rig, Cage, Chi Chi, and Fox. She sends home Cable Guy due to his lack of aggression. She was going to give Tool Box the last chain, but is informed by Flex that Tool Box said he did not have a connection with her. Daisy asks Toolbox if he wants to stay, and Tool Box said he wanted to stay, but that it was her decision. Daisy said she did not believe him and decided to eliminate him.

 The team won the challenge and went on a group date with Daisy.
 The team lost the challenge.

 Challenge: Paintball Obstacle Course
Beige Team: 6 Gauge, Brooklyn, Cable Guy, Cage
Orange Team: Big Rig, Flex, Fox, Tool Box
Black Team: 12 Pack, Chi Chi, London, Sinister
 Challenge Winners: Black Team
 Quit: Brooklyn
 Bottom 3: Fox, Cable Guy, Tool Box
 Eliminated: Cable Guy, Toolbox
 Elimination notes:
 Brooklyn withdrew because he still had feelings for his ex-girlfriend.
 Cable Guy was eliminated because he was not trying hard enough to connect with Daisy.
 Toolbox was going to receive a chain, but after being informed by Flex that Tool Box said he had no connection with Daisy, Daisy decided to eliminate him.

Should I Stay or Should I Go?
First aired May 17, 2009

 The contestant won the challenge and went on a group date with Daisy.
 The contestant lost the challenge.

 Challenge: Nursery Rhyme Re-write
 Challenge Winners: The Daisy Blades
 Quit: London
 Bottom 3: 6 Gauge, Fox, Sinister
 Eliminated: None
 Elimination Notes:
 Prior to the elimination ceremony, London was hesitant about whether or not he wanted to remain in the competition because he felt that he and Daisy were "no longer connecting". Daisy informed him that he was going to be given a chain at the elimination ceremony that night, and that she hoped he would accept it. When Daisy offered London his chain, he said he could not accept it because he said he did not want to hurt Daisy.
 Daisy did not return to the elimination ceremony after she left crying, leaving 6 Gauge, Fox, and Sinister without chains. The episode closes with the elimination ceremony still unfinished.

Bring in 'Da Boyz, Bring in 'Da Skunk
First aired May 24, 2009
 Challenge: Photoshoot for Daisy's Album Cover
Team 1: 12 Pack, Big Rig, Cage, Chi Chi
Team 2: 6 Gauge, Flex, Sinister, Fox
 Challenge Winners: Team 2
 MVP: Fox
 Quit: Cage
 Elimination Notes:
 Cage got into a fight with 6 Gauge before the elimination ceremony, and Flex intervened and jumped on Cage to stop him. The episode closes with Daisy asking Cage if he can stay in the house without fighting the other contestants. Cage replies that he cannot promise her that and says it would be best if he went home. Daisy tells him she has to let him go because she does not want the house to be an unsafe environment for any of the contestants.
 Daisy goes into the elimination room to inform the other contestants that Cage has left the house. Riki tells the contestants that they can leave the elimination ceremony and that they are all safe for that night.

Things Are Getting Spicy
First aired June 7, 2009

 The contestant won the challenge and went on a group date with Daisy.
 The contestant was named MVP and won a solo date with Daisy.
 Daisy allowed Sinister to join the group date despite Chi Chi winning the fight because he fought well.

Challenge: Fight For Daisy's Love
First Fight: Chi Chi vs. Fox
Second Fight: Big Rig vs. 12 Pack
Third Fight: Flex vs. 6 Gauge
Fourth Fight: Chi Chi vs. Sinister
 Challenge Winners: Big Rig, Chi Chi, Flex, Sinister
 MVP: Big Rig
 Bottom 3: 6 Gauge, 12 Pack, Fox
 Eliminated: 6 Gauge
 Elimination Notes:
 6 Gauge was eliminated because Daisy felt that she and 6 Gauge were not connecting.

Call's Fair in Love and War
 First aired June 14, 2009
 Challenge: None
 There was no challenge in this episode because Daisy felt the contestants had been working hard enough, but she took several of them on dates. She and 12 Pack went to a lingerie store, and she had dinner with Big Rig, Chi Chi, and Fox later on that night.
 MVP: 12 Pack
 Bottom 3: None
 Eliminated: Fox
 Elimination Notes:
 No chains were given out during this episode because Daisy told Fox to leave at the beginning of the elimination, as her suspicions that he had a girlfriend were confirmed when she called the house.

Still Haven't Found What I'm Cooking For
First aired June 21, 2009

 The contestant won the challenge, but did not go on a date with Daisy.
 The contestant won the challenge, but was named most compatible for Daisy by the other contestants and won a solo date with her.
 The contestant won the challenge and went on a date with Daisy because they named the least compatible with Daisy by the other contestants.

 Challenge: Cook A Meal For Daisy
 Challenge Winner: None (all meals were good)
 Bottom 2: Big Rig, Chi Chi
 Eliminated: Big Rig
 Elimination Notes: 
Daisy said that she was not falling in love with Big Rig and felt that he was not that compatible with her.

The Return of the Fling
First aired June 28, 2009

 The contestant earned a chain, and was not eliminated.
 The contestant was eliminated.

 Challenge: None
Date 1: Off Road Vehicle Riding with Chi Chi and Flex 
Date 2: Dinner with 12 Pack and Sinister
 MVP: 12 Pack 
 Special Guest/Brought Back: London
 Bottom 2: Chi Chi, Sinister
 Eliminated: Chi Chi
 Elimination Notes:
 Daisy said that she felt Chi Chi was more of a close friend and hoped they could remain friends.

The Past and the Furious
First aired July 12, 2009

 The contestant had some MVP time with Daisy.
 The contestant was eliminated.
 The contestant was asked to go to Maui with Daisy.
 The contestant was supposed to be eliminated, but Daisy decided to keep the contestant and bring him to Maui with her.
 The Special Guest was a friend, instead of an Ex Girlfriend.

 Challenge: None
 MVP: N/A
 Special Guest: Boys Ex Girlfriends 
 Bottom 2: Flex and Sinister
 Eliminated: Sinister
 Elimination Notes:
 Daisy felt that she was keeping Sinister in the house to protect him and not to hurt his feelings, making her feel like she led him on.

Clip Show
First aired July 19, 2009

Daisy reviews her "Rules of Dating" to the viewers based on her many experiences in the house, featuring memorable moments and clips not aired in the main episodes. Including:

The "Bromances" going on in the house.
Fox's "not so deep" thoughts on love.
Additional drama footage.
The guys "primping" themselves.
Extended footage of the skunk in the house.

Leid and Neutered
First aired July 26, 2009

3rd Place: 12 Pack
2nd Place: Flex
Winner: London

The final three head to Maui to spend some quality time in the world's most romantic island. But there is trouble in paradise when Daisy narrows the field to 2 in a tear-filled elimination on a desolate airstrip. The two remaining guys go on emotional final dates with Daisy. Only one guy can be her Rockstar, while the other finds out that "aloha" also means "goodbye".
 Elimination Notes:
 12 Pack was eliminated because Daisy felt that too many people are trying to push her into choosing him.
 No reasons given for Flex’s elimination, Daisy merely said that she picked London.

After the show
'84, '85, and '86 appeared in Lady Gaga's music video for her single "Paparazzi".
Big Rig and Marcia from VH1's Rock of Love Bus and Charm School with Ricki Lake dated for a brief time, but are now separated.
 VH1 has officially confirmed that Daisy and London are no longer together. Daisy also had posted a MySpace Blog about it.
Professor (Brandon), Weasel (Pauly), Fox (Daniel), Big Rig (Jeremiah), and Sinister (Derrick) were contestants on the canceled third season of I Love Money.
6 Gauge (Chris), Brooklyn (Christopher), and Chi-Chi (Branden) appeared on the fourth season of I Love Money.
Big Rig appeared as a contestant on the revival of WWE Tough Enough, he placed 3rd overall in the competition.
12 Pack claimed that, following this show, producers offered him his own show, which was later abandoned when VH1 suspended reality programming.

References

External links
 

American dating and relationship reality television series
VH1 original programming
2009 American television series debuts
2009 American television series endings
English-language television shows
2000s American reality television series